David John Lupton (born 7 August 1948) is a former English cricketer.  Lupton was a right-handed batsman who bowled right-arm fast-medium.  He was born in Millom, Cumberland.

Lupton made his debut for Cumberland in the 1975 Minor Counties Championship against the Lancashire Second XI.  Lupton played Minor counties cricket for Cumberland from 1975 to 1985, including 48 Minor Counties Championship matches and 4 MCCA Knockout Trophy matches.  In 1985, he played his only List A match against Derbyshire in the NatWest Trophy.  In this match he was dismissed for a duck by Kim Barnett, but in the Derbyshire innings he did take the wicket of Barnett, which was the only dismissal in the innings.

References

External links
David Luton at ESPNcricinfo
David Lupton at CricketArchive

1948 births
Living people
People from Millom
Cricketers from Cumbria
English cricketers
Cumberland cricketers